The Springfield Jaycee Open was a golf tournament on the LPGA Tour from 1969 to 1970. It was played at the Northwood Hills Country Club in Springfield, Ohio.

Winners
Springfield Jaycee Open
1970 Judy Rankin

Stroh's-WBLY Open
1969 Marlene Hagge

References

Former LPGA Tour events
Golf in Ohio
1969 establishments in Ohio
1970 disestablishments in Ohio
Recurring sporting events established in 1969
Recurring sporting events disestablished in 1970
History of women in Ohio